Connor Francis Prielipp (born January 10, 2001) is an American professional baseball pitcher in the Minnesota Twins organization.

Amateur career
Prielipp attended Tomah High School in Tomah, Wisconsin. In 2018, his junior year, he posted a 0.27 ERA with 97 strikeouts over 52 innings. As a senior in 2019, he went 6-2 with a 0.85 ERA, 118 strikeouts, and five walks over 49 innings and was named the Gatorade Wisconsin Baseball Player of the Year. He was selected by the Boston Red Sox in the 37th round of the 2019 Major League Baseball draft, but did not sign and enrolled at the University of Alabama to play college baseball.

Prielipp was named Alabama's Opening Day starter as a freshman in 2020. He started four games in which he struck out 35 batters and gave up no earned runs over 21 innings before the season was cancelled due to the COVID-19 pandemic. In 2021, he pitched seven innings before missing the rest of the season due to an injury. He underwent Tommy John surgery in May. There was a chance Prielipp would be able to return for part of the 2022 season, but he announced that April that he would be opting out and would not play. He instead began throwing bullpen sessions for major league scouts. In June, he traveled to San Diego where he participated in the Draft Combine.

Professional career
Prielipp was selected by the Minnesota Twins in the second round with the 48th overall selection of the 2022 Major League Baseball draft. He signed with the team for $1.8 million.

References

External links
Alabama Crimson Tide bio

2001 births
Living people
Baseball players from Wisconsin
Baseball pitchers
Alabama Crimson Tide baseball players